Ognjen Rolović (born 25 August 1993) is Montenegrin footballer who plays as a forward.

Club career
Born in Podgorica, Rolović started his career in his hometown club FK Mladost, making his debut in 2011, against FK Budućnost Podgorica, playing last nine minutes of the game. For the following seasons Rolović was rarely given a chance. He only managed to make 14 appearances for Mladost, scoring a single goal against FK Lovćen in 2012.

In order to gain more playing experience, Rolović first was loaned to third tier side FK Zabjelo and then to lower division Swedish club Srbija FF, where he managed to score 2 goals in 10 appearances.

After loan spells, Rolović left FK Mladost and joined FK Kom, playing in second tier. Before cancelling agreement with the club at the end of 2015, Rolović managed to make 12 appearances for the club, without scoring a goal.

In 2016, Rolović moved to Malta and signed a deal with Kerċem Ajax, where he spent six months, before leaving the club at the end of November. However, in the second half of 2017, Rolovic again returned to the club and some successful performances led to his loan move to Birkirkara in 2018.
 
In 2018, Rolović moved to Albanian Superliga club FC Kamza. He made his debut against FK Tirana. He managed to score two goals in 16 appearances for the first part of the season, before leaving the club in December.

In 2019, Rolović joined Saburtalo Tbilisi, scoring the first ever goal for the club in European competitions, against Sheriff Tiraspol in UEFA Champions League qualifying.

In March 2020, Rolović signed for Belarusian team Minsk. He made nine appearances, scoring one goal. On 22 June, the club announced that Rolovic had left the club.

References

External links
 
 UEFA profile
 Birkirkara player profile

1993 births
Living people
Footballers from Podgorica
Association football forwards
Montenegrin footballers
OFK Titograd players
FK Zabjelo players
FK Kom players
Kerċem Ajax F.C. players
Birkirkara F.C. players
FC Kamza players
FC Saburtalo Tbilisi players
FC Minsk players
FK Dečić players
FK Mornar players
OFK Petrovac players
Montenegrin First League players
Maltese Premier League players
Kategoria Superiore players
Erovnuli Liga players
Belarusian Premier League players
Montenegrin expatriate footballers
Expatriate footballers in Sweden
Montenegrin expatriate sportspeople in Sweden
Expatriate footballers in Malta
Montenegrin expatriate sportspeople in Malta
Expatriate footballers in Albania
Montenegrin expatriate sportspeople in Albania
Expatriate footballers in Georgia (country)
Montenegrin expatriate sportspeople in Georgia (country)
Expatriate footballers in Belarus
Montenegrin expatriate sportspeople in Belarus